Bettws , is a small ex-mining and farming village in the South Wales Valleys in the county borough of Bridgend, Wales. Bettws is also an electoral ward to the county council.

Bryngarw Country Park is approximately one mile away, with a footpath leading there from the village. The village is around 3 miles away from Junction 36 on the M4 Motorway, and is located to the west of Llangeinor and to the north of Brynmenyn.

Geography
Bettws is located in the southern part of Bridgend County Borough in South Wales. It is situated on the River Ogmore, and is watered by the Llynfi and Garw rivulets which border the village on both its sides. The nearest parish to Bettws is Llangeinor to the north-east, and Llangynwyd to the west.

The population of Bettws is around 2,400 according to The Betws LIFE Centre.

Etymology 
The name of the village comes from the Middle English word bedhus, meaning "prayer house", which became betws in Welsh.

Governance 
At the national level Bettws is in the Welsh parliamentary constituency of Ogmore, for which Chris Elmore (Labour) has been MP since a by-election in 2016 which he won with a majority of 8,575.

In the Senedd Bettws is in the constituency of Bridgend for which Carwyn Jones, the First Minister of Wales, has been the Member of the Senedd since 1999.

For European elections Bettws was in the Wales constituency prior to 2020.

At the county level, Bettws is an electoral ward to Bridgend County Borough Council, since 1995 electing one county councillor. Until June 2012 this was Labour councillor Christopher Michaelides who, shortly after finishing his year as county mayor and a month after winning the 2012 elections, died from cancer.

Demography 

In the 2011 census Bettws village had 910 dwellings, 884 households and a population of 2,253 (1,093 males and 1,157 females). The average age of residents was 36 years. Of those aged between 16 and 74, 48.4% had no academic qualifications or one GCSE. According to the census, 707 people were economically inactive of which 117 of those that stated they were economically active were unemployed. Christianity was the majority religion in the village being represented by 978 individuals, with 1061 recorded as having no religion and 195 whose religion was not stated.

Sport
Bettws F.C. are based in the village, the club also run numerous youth teams, including the successful under 19's. BETTWS BECAME WELSH LEAGUE DIVISION 1 CHAMPIONS IN EARLY 2000

Schools 
Almost all children aged 3–11 attend Betws Primary School.
When pupils complete Key Stage Two, 91% of students attend Coleg Cymunedol Y Dderwen (formally Ynysawdre Comprehensive School and Ogmore School), with a minority attending Ysgol Gyfun Gymraeg Llangynwyd (they formally transferred to Ysgol Gyfun Llanhari) or Brynteg Comprehensive School. Many special need pupils go on to attend Ysgol Bryn Castell.

Leisure
Betws Eco Lodge  is situated in the heart of the village. It caters for groups and individuals in a Bunkhouse style. The project is run by The Youth of Bettws, a local Charity for young people between the ages of 7 to 25 years old. Bryngarw Country Park lies to the south.

Notable people
Griffith J. Griffith, philanthropist.

References

External links

 The Garw Valley Web Site
Betwsecolodge.co.uk

Villages in Bridgend County Borough
Wards of Bridgend County Borough